The Battle of Beas River was a battle that took place between the Chagatai Khanate and the Mamluk Sultanate in 1285. Ghiyas ud din Balban arranged a military defense line across the Beas River as part of his "blood and iron" fortification chain strategy at Multan and Lahore as a countermeasure against the Chagatai Khanate invasion. Balban managed to repulse the invasion. However, his son Muhammad Khan was slain in battle.

Primary sources 
 Tarikh-i-Firuz Shahi Ziauddin Barani

Reference List

1285 in Asia
13th century in India
Mamluk dynasty (Delhi)
Beas River
Beas River
1285 in the Mongol Empire
Wars involving the Chagatai Khanate